John C. Sikes House is a historic home located at Monroe, Union County, North Carolina.  It was  built in 1926–1927, and consists of a -story, five bay by four bay, Classical Revival style main block with a two-story rear ell.  The house is constructed of yellow Roman brick and has a gable roof. The front facade features a parapeted portico supported by six stone Tuscan order columns.

It was listed on the National Register of Historic Places in 1982.

References

Houses on the National Register of Historic Places in North Carolina
Neoclassical architecture in North Carolina
Houses completed in 1927
Houses in Union County, North Carolina
National Register of Historic Places in Union County, North Carolina
1927 establishments in North Carolina